There are several groups named Revolutionary Workers Party:

Revolutionary Workers' Party (Bolivia)
Revolutionary Workers Party (Canada)
Revolutionary Workers Party (Chile)
Revolutionary Workers Party (India)
Revolutionary Workers' Party (Peru)
Revolutionary Workers' Party (Philippines)
Revolutionary Workers' Party (Russia)
Revolutionary Workers' Party (Spain)
Revolutionary Workers Party (Sri Lanka)
Revolutionary Workers' Party (Turkey)
Revolutionary Workers' Party (Trotskyist), UK

See also
 Workers' Revolutionary Party (disambiguation)

Political party disambiguation pages